Sanation was a Polish political movement that was created in the interwar period, prior to Józef Piłsudski's May 1926 Coup d'État, and came to power in the wake of that coup.  In 1928 its political activists would go on to form the Nonpartisan Bloc for Cooperation with the Government (BBWR).

The Sanation movement took its name from Piłsudski's aspirations for a moral "sanation" (healing) of the Polish body politic.  The movement functioned integrally until his death in 1935.  Following Piłsudski's death, Sanation split into several competing factions, including "the Castle" (President Ignacy Mościcki and his partisans).

Sanation, which advocated authoritarian rule, rested on a circle of Piłsudski's close associates, including Walery Sławek, Aleksander Prystor, Kazimierz Świtalski, Janusz Jędrzejewicz, Adam Koc, Józef Beck, Tadeusz Hołówko, Bogusław Miedziński, and Edward Rydz-Śmigły. It preached the primacy of the national interest in governance, and contended against the system of parliamentary democracy.

Background
Named after the Latin word for "healing" ("sanatio"), the Sanation movement mainly comprised former military officers who were disgusted with the perceived corruption in Polish politics. Sanation was a coalition of rightists, leftists and centrists whose main focus was the elimination of corruption and the reduction of inflation.

Sanation appeared prior to the May 1926 Coup d'État and lasted until World War II but was never formalized. Piłsudski, though he had been the former leader of the Polish Socialist Party, had grown to disapprove of political parties, which he saw as promoting their own interests rather than supporting the state and the people.  For this reason, the Sanation movement never led to the creation of a political party. Instead, in 1928 Sanation members created a Bezpartyjny Blok Współpracy z Rządem ("Nonpartisan Bloc for Cooperation with the Government"), a pro-government grouping that denied being a political party.

History
Although Piłsudski never claimed personal power, he exercised extensive influence over Polish politics after Sanation took power in 1926. For the next decade, he dominated Polish affairs as strongman of a generally popular centrist regime. Kazimierz Bartel's government and all subsequent governments were first unofficially approved by Piłsudski before they could be confirmed by the President.

In the course of pursuing "sanation", Piłsudski mixed democratic and authoritarian elements.  Poland's internal stability was enhanced, while economic stagnation was ended by Eugeniusz Kwiatkowski's reforms. At the same time, the Sanation regime prosecuted communist parties (on the ostensible formal grounds that they had failed to legally register as political parties) and sought to limit the influence of opposition parties by splitting their forces.

A distinguishing feature of the regime was that, unlike the situation in most of non-democratic Europe, it never transformed itself into a full-scale dictatorship. Freedom of speech and press and political parties were never legally abolished, and opponents were usually dealt with via "unidentified perpetrators" rather than court sentences. Sanation allowed the 1928 election to be relatively free, but was dealt a setback when its supporters in the BBWR came up far short of a majority.  Before the 1930 election some opposition parties united into the Centrolew coalition, calling for a violent overthrow of the government; Sanacja reacted by arresting more than 20 prominent opposition leaders that participated in Centrolew. Under these conditions, the BBWR won over 46 percent of the vote and a large majority in both houses.

Józef Piłsudski's personal cult stemmed from his general popularity among the nation rather than from top-down propaganda; this is notable, considering Piłsudski's disdain for democracy. Sanation's ideology never went beyond populist calls to clean up the country's politics and economy; it did not occupy itself with society, as was the case with contemporary fascist regimes. From 1929, the semi-official newspaper of Sanation, and thus of the Polish government, was Gazeta Polska (the Polish Gazette).

Legislative agenda
The Sanation government invalidated the May 1930 election results by disbanding the parliament in August and with increasing pressure on the opposition started a new campaign, the new elections being scheduled to November. Using the anti-government demonstrations as a pretext, 20 members of the opposition parties, including most of the leaders of Centrolew alliance (from the Socialists, Polish People's Party "Piast" and Polish People's Party "Wyzwolenie") were arrested in September without a warrant, only on the order of Piłsudski and the then-Minister of Internal Security, Felicjan Sławoj Składkowski, accusing them of plotting an anti-government coup. The opposition members (who included the former prime minister Wincenty Witos, and Wojciech Korfanty) were imprisoned in the Brest Fortress, where their trial took place (thus the popular name for the election: the 'Brest election'). A number of less known activists were arrested throughout the country. They were released after the end of the election in the same month. The Brest trial ended in January 1932, with 10 accused receiving sentences up to three years of imprisonment; the appeals of 1933 confirmed the sentences. The government however gave the accused choice of emigrating: five of them took it, the other five to serve the prison term instead.

In April 1935, shortly before Piłsudski's death, a new constitution (the "April Constitution") was adopted, which supported Sanation's principal ideas: a strong centralized state with a presidential system of government. Piłsudski died soon after, however, and Sanation faced some serious internal problems. Eventually it devolved into three separate movements:
 "the "Colonels" (Pułkownicy, formed around Walery Sławek), which sought a modus vivendi with the opposition;
 "the Castle" (Zamek, formed around President Ignacy Mościcki, who resided in the Warsaw Castle — hence the movement's name), which became the center; and
 GISZ (Generalny Inspektor Sił Zbrojnych, formed around General Inspector Edward Rydz-Śmigły), which soon became virtually indistinguishable from the Camp of National Unity.

The first of these Sanation movements soon lost much of its importance, but the other two continued the ideological struggle within the country until the outbreak of war.

World War II
During the 1939 invasion of Poland, many Sanation members were taken prisoner-of-war by the Germans, while others evacuated to Romania, where they remained until war's end or were able to go on to France or Britain.

Though France insisted on excluding Sanationists from the Polish Government in Exile, many remained highly influential. During the war, Sanation members created several resistance organizations, including in 1942 the Fighting Poland Movement (Obóz Polski Walczącej) and the Convention of Independence Organizations (Konwent Organizacji Niepodległościowych), which in 1943 became subordinate to the Home Army and in 1944 merged into the Union of Independence Organizations (Zjednoczenie Organizacji Niepodległościowych).

After World War II, the Soviet-installed communist regime executed or forced many Sanationists into permanent exile, and branded them enemies of the state.

Notable members
 Józef Beck
 Tadeusz Hołówko
 Janusz Jędrzejewicz 
 Wacław Jędrzejewicz
 Adam Koc
 Leon Kozłowski
 Ignacy Matuszewski
 Bogusław Miedziński
 Ignacy Mościcki
 Bronisław Pieracki
 Józef Piłsudski
 Aleksander Prystor
 Edward Rydz-Śmigły
 Adam Skwarczyński
 Walery Sławek
 Kazimierz Świtalski

See also
 Bereza Kartuska prison
 Law and Justice, founded in 2001, one of Poland's major political parties today often considered a modern successor to the Sanation movement 
 European interwar dictatorships
 Intermarium
 Piłsudski's colonels
 Polish Underground State
 Prometheism

Notes

References
 
 
 Adam Zamoyski, The Polish Way: A Thousand-Year History of the Poles and Their Culture, New York, Hippocrene Books, 1994, .
 Encyklopedia Polski via Google Books, p. 601– .

Military dictatorships
Józef Piłsudski
Second Polish Republic
Political history of Poland
May Coup (Poland)
Political movements in Poland